Zaton Doli   is a village in Croatia, on the border with Neum, Bosnia and Herzegovina. It is connected by the D8 highway.

References

Populated places in Dubrovnik-Neretva County